St Nicholas’ Church, Elmdon is a Grade II listed Church of England parish church in Birmingham.

History

The Elmdon estate was purchased in 1760 by Birmingham banker, Abraham Spooner (ca. 1690–1788). Elmdon Hall was stated in 1780 and at the same time, he demolished the old medieval church, and constructed a new one adjacent to Elmdon Hall (demolished in 1956), to the designs of John Standbridge of Warwick. It was altered in 1864 and restored in 1880 at a cost of £640.

The church was extended in 1979 when a new nave was added to the south.

Monuments

Isaac Spooner 1816, by Seaborne of Birmingham
Abraham Spooner (d.1788) and his wife Anne (d. 1783)
Abraham Spooner Lillingston (d. 1836) by Wilkes of Birmingham
Jane, Dowager Countess of Rosse (d. 1837) by Wilkes of Birmingham

References

Church of England church buildings in Birmingham, West Midlands
Churches completed in 1781
Rebuilt churches in the United Kingdom
18th-century Church of England church buildings
Grade II listed buildings in Birmingham
Grade II listed churches in the West Midlands (county)